Svatopluk Karásek (18 October 1942 – 20 December 2020) was a Czech singer, evangelical clergyman, and politician who served as a member of the Chamber of Deputies. His brother was the photographer Oldřich Karásek.

He was a signatory to Charter 77.

References

1942 births
2020 deaths
Charter 77 signatories
Czech politicians
Freedom Union – Democratic Union politicians
Green Party (Czech Republic) politicians
Politicians from Prague
Members of the Chamber of Deputies of the Czech Republic (2002–2006)